is a passenger railway station located in the city of Koshigaya, Saitama, Japan, operated by East Japan Railway Company (JR East).

Lines
It is also located adjacent to Shin-Koshigaya Station on the Tobu Skytree Line.

Station layout
The elevated station consists of two side platforms serving two tracks. The station has a Midori no Madoguchi staffed ticket office.

Platforms

History
The station opened on 1 April 1973. The adjacent Shin-Koshigaya Station opened on 23 July 1974, providing an interchange with the Tōbu Isesaki Line (now Tōbu Skytree Line).

Passenger statistics
In fiscal 2019, the station was used by an average of 75,390 passengers daily (boarding passengers only). The daily average passenger figures (boarding passengers only) in previous years are as shown below.

Surrounding area
 Shin-Koshigaya Station (Tōbu Skytree Line)
 Saitama Toho Junior College
 Koshigaya Freight Terminal
 Dokkyo Medical University Koshigaya Hospital

See also
 List of railway stations

References

External links

  

Railway stations in Japan opened in 1973
Stations of East Japan Railway Company
Railway stations in Saitama Prefecture
Musashino Line
Koshigaya, Saitama